Wahgunyah  is a town in northeastern Victoria, Australia. The town is on the southern bank of the Murray River, opposite Corowa, New South Wales, in the Shire of Indigo.

The name is believed to be an aboriginal phrase meaning the resting place of crows.

History 
The Wahgunyah cattle run was leased by John Foord and John Crisp in 1841. The township was established by Foord in 1856 and became important before the arrival of the railway in 1879 as the furthest upstream port on the Murray. The Post Office opened on 1 July 1858   and a school opened the same year.

All Saints Estate winery to the north of town was established in 1864 by Scottish emigrants George Sutherland Smith and John Banks and its extensive cellar building was, at least in part, modelled on the Castle of Mey near Smith and Banks's home town Caithness.

The town today 
The main factory of Nestlé’s breakfast cereal arm Uncle Tobys is on the outskirts of Wahgunyah.

Sports and Recreation

The town has had an Australian rules football team since 1877 and Wahgunyah's first recorded match was against Corowa and was a return match against Corowa Football Club on Saturday, 16 June 1877, played "on the hill" in Corowa, with Wahgunyah winning the first encounter. Throughout 1877, there was talk of the Wahgunyah and Corowa Football Club's merging to form one stronger club and be called Border United Football Club. This merger actually took place and their first match as Border United was played against the Rutherglen Football Club in August 1877 and was captained by Jacob Levin. The Border United team wore pink and white colours. Border United FC remained in place until 1905, when they both entered stand alone teams in the Corowa District Football Association  in 1906.

Wahgunyah have won the following seven senior football premierships in the Coreen & District Football League - 1948, 1949, 1968, 1997, 1998, 2002, 2004.

Wahgunyah played in the Chiltern & District Football Association between 1920 & 1921, 1923 - 1929, 1931 - 1937, 1950, 1953 - 1956, winning senior football premierships in 1955 and 1956.

At present (2021) compete in the Tallangatta & District Football League after having been in the Coreen & District Football League until 2007.

References

External links

Wahgunyah Football / Netball Club

Towns in Victoria (Australia)
Shire of Indigo
Populated places on the Murray River